Kearns may refer to:

Places 
 Kearns, Ontario, part of an incorporated township in Canada.
 Kearns, New South Wales in Australia
 Kearns, Utah in the United States

Other uses 
 Kearns (surname)